Intelligent Finance (IF) is a Scottish offset bank, a division of Bank of Scotland plc which is part of Lloyds Banking Group. It was established as a division of Halifax plc in 1999 by Jim Spowart, who helped establish other direct financial services firms including Direct Line.

Following a reorganisation of the HBOS group, it is now a division of Bank of Scotland plc.  IF's registered headquarters are in Edinburgh, with customer service operations based in Scotland (Livingston, West Lothian, and Rosyth, Fife. It operates throughout the United Kingdom.

IF was set up at a time when many banks were exploring opportunities to use new technology to reduce the costs of providing financial services. IF established what it marketed as "intelligent" products whereby customer pick a combination of all or some of a range of bank accounts including current account, savings account, mortgage and credit card. The credit balance in a person's current account and saving accounts would "offset" any debit balances in the person's mortgage and credit card accounts. The customer would then pay interest on the net balance, potentially allowing savings to be made on borrowings. However, in June 2005 IF withdrew its offset credit card, citing high running costs.

Although the bank was hit by technical problems at its launch, it quickly gained a significant market share in the mortgage and current account market, and is still one of the largest in the U.K

Intelligent Finance sponsored the Scottish First Division football team Livingston FC.  From 2006 to 2008 it sponsored the if.comedies award, successor to the Perrier Comedy Award, at the Edinburgh Fringe.

In July 2009, Intelligent Finance withdrew its mortgage and current account products to new customers, although existing customers were unaffected. In March 2013, Intelligent Finance withdrew all its remaining products to new customers. As with mortgages, existing customers continued to be able to operate their accounts.

In Summer 2014, Intelligent Finance asked its savings customers to consider moving their accounts to TSB Bank.  Lloyds Banking Group was asked to close Intelligent Finance to new business by the European Commission in order to reduce their market share.

References

External links

 

Banks of Scotland
Lloyds Banking Group
British companies established in 1999
Banks established in 1999
Companies based in Edinburgh
1999 establishments in Scotland
Financial services brands